Melancholy Baby is a drama/thriller short film, written and directed by Sean Hood, and starring Patrick Labyorteaux, who plays a man suffering from both agoraphobia and obsessive-compulsive disorder. The film is notable for its creative use of sound design.

Although its official premiere was at the Garden State Film Festival in 2009, the film screened at the Directors Guild of America as part of a gala fund raiser for Filmmakers Alliance.

Plot
Zachariah Block is a shut-in who spends much of his day compulsively sorting and resorting ordinary objects into jars. His routine changes when a woman moves into the apartment next door. By listening to her movements through the walls and watching her through a vent, he becomes drawn into her life. When he senses that she is in danger, this very eccentric and alienated character overcomes his debilitating fears, summons up a small act of genuine courage, and saves his neighbors life.

Production
The screenplay for Melancholy Baby was developed in a workshop sponsored by Filmmakers Alliance. The script went on to win The Los Angeles Short Filmmaking Grant. Using a crew made up primarily of Filmmakers Alliance members, the film was shot over the course of a single weekend. It was shot on the Red One, a camera made by the Red Digital Cinema Camera Company.

Awards
Los Angeles Short Filmmaking Grant 2007
Accolade Competition
Award of Excellence, Short Film 2009
USA Film Festival/Short Film & Video Competition
Finalist

See also
 List of American films of 2009

References

External links

American thriller films
2009 films
2000s thriller films
2009 short films
Films about obsessive–compulsive disorder
2000s English-language films
Films with screenplays by Sean Hood
Films directed by Sean Hood
2000s American films